Mats Wilander defeated Pat Cash in the final, 6–3, 6–7(3–7), 3–6, 6–1, 8–6 to win the men's singles tennis title at the 1988 Australian Open.

Stefan Edberg was the two-time defending champion, but lost in the semifinals to Wilander.

This marked the first edition of the tournament to be held on hardcourts, having previously been held on grass courts.

Seeds
The seeded players are listed below. Mats Wilander is the champion; others show the round in which they were eliminated.

  Ivan Lendl (semifinals)
  Stefan Edberg (semifinals)
  Mats Wilander (champion)
  Pat Cash (finals)
  Yannick Noah (fourth round)
  Anders Järryd (quarterfinals)
  Henri Leconte (third round)
  Slobodan Živojinović (third round)

  Jakob Hlasek (first round)
  Amos Mansdorf (first round)
  Peter Lundgren (second round)
  Christo van Rensburg (third round)
  Paul Annacone (first round)
  Jonas Svensson (fourth round)
  Kelly Evernden (first round)
  Wally Masur (fourth round)

Qualifying

Draw

Finals

Top half

Section 1

Section 2

Section 3

Section 4

Bottom half

Section 5

Section 6

Section 7

Section 8

External links
 Association of Tennis Professionals (ATP) – 1988 Australian Open Men's Singles draw
 1988 Australian Open – Men's draws and results at the International Tennis Federation

Mens singles
Australian Open (tennis) by year – Men's singles